The name Rai has been used for two tropical cyclones in the western north Pacific Ocean. The name was contributed by Micronesia where large carved artifacts called Rai stones are a national symbol. It replaced Fanapi after the 2010 storm, which replaced Rananim after the 2004 storm.

 Tropical Storm Rai (2016) (T1615, 19W) – a short-lived storm that made landfall on Indochina.
 Typhoon Rai (2021) (T2122, 28W, Odette) – a powerful Category 5-equivalent super typhoon that caused severe and widespread damage in the Southern and Central Philippines.

Pacific typhoon set index articles